Point Conception (Chumash: Humqaq) is a headland along the Gaviota Coast in southwestern Santa Barbara County, California. It is the point where the Santa Barbara Channel meets the Pacific Ocean, and as the corner between the mostly north-south trending portion of coast to the north and the east-west trending part of the coast near Santa Barbara, it makes a natural division between Southern and Central California, and is commonly used as such in regional weather forecasts.  The Point Conception Lighthouse is at its tip.

Toponymy
Point Conception was named Cabo de Galera by Spanish maritime explorer Juan Rodriguez Cabrillo in 1542. In 1602, Sebastian Vizcaíno sailed past again, renaming the protruding headland Punta de la Limpia Concepción ("Point of the Immaculate Conception"). Vizcaíno's name stuck, and was later anglicized to today's version.

Chumash beliefs
The Chumash people of the region have traditionally known Point Conception as the "Western Gate", through which the souls of the dead could pass between the mortal world and the heavenly paradise of Similaqsa.

It is called Humqaq ("The Raven Comes") in the Chumashan languages.

In 1978, the Point Conception area was occupied "by Chumash and other Native Americans trying to save it from development by a liquefied natural gas company."

References

Further reading
Courtney Milne, Sacred Places in North America: A Journey into the Medicine Wheel (New York: Stewart, Tabori & Chang, 1995).

Landforms of Santa Barbara County, California
Conception
Chumash
Religious places of the indigenous peoples of North America